Femoral circumflex artery may refer to:

 Medial circumflex femoral artery
 Lateral circumflex femoral artery